Guillermo Antonio Castro Orellana (born 25 June 1940 in San Salvador) is a retired footballer from El Salvador.

Club career
Nicknamed el Loro (the Parrot), he has most notably played for local side Atlético Marte, with whom he made his debut in 1960. He has also had spells at UES and Juventud Independiente.

International career
Castro represented his country at the 1968 Summer Olympics, in five FIFA World Cup qualification matches and at the 1970 FIFA World Cup in Mexico.

Retirement
He has been involved with El Salvador's coaches association for 30 years and has also managed league sides Independiente de San Vicente, Chalatenango and Atlético Marte.

References

External links
 ¿Qué PASó con... "el loro" castro ? – El Salvador.com 

1940 births
Living people
Sportspeople from San Salvador
Association football defenders
Salvadoran footballers
El Salvador international footballers
Olympic footballers of El Salvador
Footballers at the 1968 Summer Olympics
1970 FIFA World Cup players
Salvadoran football managers
C.D. Atlético Marte footballers
C.D. Juventud Independiente players